Amela is a name. Notable people with this name include:

 Amela Fetahović, Bosnian football player
 Amela Kršo (born 1994), Bosnian football player
 Amela Terzić (born 1993), Serbian middle-distance runner
 Víctor Amela (born 1960), Spanish writer and journalist